Sakibul Gani (born 2 September 1999) is an Indian cricketer. In February 2022, he became the first cricketer to score a triple century on debut in a first-class match.

He made his List A debut on 7 October 2019, for Bihar in the 2019–20 Vijay Hazare Trophy. He made his Twenty20 debut on 11 January 2021, for Bihar in the 2020–21 Syed Mushtaq Ali Trophy. He made his first-class debut on 17 February 2022, for Bihar in the 2021–22 Ranji Trophy. He went on to score 341 runs, becoming the first player to score a triple century on their first-class debut. Gani scored 98 and 101 not out in his next two innings, giving him the highest aggregate in a batter's first three innings in first-class cricket with 540 runs.

References

External links
 

1999 births
Living people
Indian cricketers
Bihar cricketers
Place of birth missing (living people)